The 2016 UC Davis football team represented the University of California, Davis as a member of the Big Sky Conference during the 2016 NCAA Division I FCS football season. Led by Ron Gould in his fourth and final season as head coach, UC Davis compiled an overall record of 3–8 with a mark of 2–6 in conference play, placing in four-way tie for ninth in the Big Sky. The Aggies played home games at Aggie Stadium in Davis, California.

Gould was fired on November 21. He finished his tenure at UC Davis with an overall record of 12–33.

Schedule

Game summaries

at Oregon

Southern Oregon

at Wyoming

Weber State

at Eastern Washington

at Southern Utah

Northern Colorado

at Cal Poly

Portland State

at Montana State

Sacramento State

References

UC Davis
UC Davis Aggies football seasons
UC Davis Aggies football